Orbea is a genus of flowering plants of the family Apocynaceae, first described as a genus in 1812. It is native to Africa and the Arabian Peninsula.

Species
Species accepted by the Plants of the World Online as of February 2023:

Formerly included
moved to other genera (Pachycymbium, Stisseria)

References

Apocynaceae genera
Asclepiadoideae